Mikhaylovka is a rural locality (a village) in Michurinsky Selsoviet, Sharansky District, Bashkortostan, Russia. The population was 138 as of 2010. There are 4 streets.

Geography 
Mikhaylovka is located 26 km northeast of Sharan (the district's administrative centre) by road. Novotroitsk is the nearest rural locality.

References 

Rural localities in Sharansky District